Miltochrista miniata, the rosy footman, is a moth of the family Erebidae. The species was first described by Johann Reinhold Forster in 1771. It is found in the temperate parts of the Palearctic realm – Europe, Asia Minor, Caucasus, northern Kazakhstan, southern Siberia, Amur, Primorye, Sakhalin, southern Kuriles, Heilongjiang, Liaoning, Hebei, Inner Mongolia, Shanxi, Sichuan, Korea and Japan, but may be replaced by Miltochrista rosaria in the eastern Palearctic.

Technical description and variation

The wingspan is 23–27 mm. Tannish-peach ground colour, rose-red margin to the forewing, and on this wing a black dentate line beyond the middle, and black, elongate spots before the margin. In the male the costa is curved upwards beyond the apex of the cell. In ab. rosaria Butler (now full species Miltochrista rosaria), which is commoner in the east of the area of distribution than in the west, and is perhaps a distinct species, the ground colour is more yellow; and in ab. crogea Bignault the wings are quite pale yellow, the forewing being edged with bright yellow.

Biology
The moth flies from June to September depending on the location. Often occurs singly, in broadleaf and mixed forests, on moors, at road-side ditches, on umbellifers or scabious.

Egg oval, yellow. Larva grey, with blackish head, with long and dense hairs, hibernating, until June on lichens on walls and fences. The caterpillars feed on lichen. Pupa black-brown, abdomen with yellow incisions, in a cocoon densely intermixed with hairs.

References

External links

Fauna Europaea 
 Taxonomy
Lepiforum e.V.

miniata
Moths of Asia
Moths of Europe
Moths described in 1771
Taxa named by Johann Reinhold Forster
Palearctic Lepidoptera